Ki Darun Dekhte is a 2014 Bangladeshi Bengali-language film directed by Wazed Ali Sumon. The film stars Bappy Chowdhury, Mahiya Mahi, Shahriaz, Omar Sani, and Misha Sawdagor.

Plot
Mahi used to disguise herself as a black woman to save herself from roadside romeos and to find her true love. Meanwhile, a gentle boy Apon and a goon-typed boy Songram fall in love with her. Will Mahi be able to find her true love ?

Cast
 Bappy Chowdhury as Apon
 Mahiya Mahi as Mahi
 Shahriaz as Songram
 Omar Sani as Mahi's Brother 
 Misha Sawdagor as Babor Ali, Songram's Brother
 Sohel Khan
 Tanha Moumasi
 Ahmed Sharif (actor)

Release
The release of Ki Darun Dekhte was originally scheduled to take place in 70 theaters on 29 November 2013. It had to be postponed because of political violence connected with protests, strikes, and blockades called by the 18-party opposition alliance in the months leading up to the 5 January 2014 general election.

References

2010s Bengali-language films
Bengali-language Bangladeshi films
2014 films
Bangladeshi drama films
Films scored by Ahmed Humayun
2014 drama films
Films directed by Wajed Ali Sumon